The No.1 Armoured Car Company RAF was a military unit of Britain's Royal Air Force (RAF) based in Iraq and which played a role in the defence of RAF Habbaniya during World War II.

Creation 
On 19 December 1921, "No. 1 Armoured Car Company RAF" was formed at Heliopolis in the Kingdom of Egypt and then moved to Palestine, being disbanded there on 1 December 1923 with elements being absorbed into No. 2 Armoured Car Company RAF.
During the 1920s further RAF Armoured Car Companies (Nos 3, 4, 5 & 6) were formed in Iraq but by 1930 they were consolidated into No. 1 Company with its base at RAF Hinaidi and sections at Mosul and RAF Shaibah.

Composition and organization 
During the Anglo-Iraqi War, the No. 1 Armoured Car Company RAF was composed of eighteen Rolls-Royce armoured cars and several Morris tenders.  These vehicles were among the last of a consignment of ex-Royal Naval Armoured Car Division armoured cars that had been serving in the Middle East since 1915.  In addition to the Rolls-Royce armoured cars, the company had two ancient tanks, named "Walrus" and "Seal."

The company was organised into a headquarters and three sections.  Each section had six armoured cars and two wireless tenders. The make-up of the company did however vary from time to time. Various sections would be detached to other RAF bases in Iraq and on various duties throughout Iraq (and even beyond).

The company was based at RAF Hinaidi Cantonment until it moved to RAF Habbaniya in 1936 (and Hinaidi became the Iraqi Rashid Airbase). RAF Habbaniya had purpose built, modern facilities for both men and machines in the Armoured Car Lines.

Renaming
On 3 October 1946 the company was incorporated into the RAF Regiment and named No. 2701 Armoured Squadron.
On 25 February 1947, this unit was renamed No. 1 Squadron RAF Regiment.

See also 

 Royal Naval Air Service
 RAF Iraq Command
RAF Habbaniya
 RAF Regiment
 No. 1 Squadron RAF Regiment
 1941 Iraqi coup d'état
 Iraqforce
 Number 2 Armoured Car Company RAF

Notes

References

External links
 RAF Regiment Official Site
 RAF Web
 RAF Habbaniya Association website

1 Armoured Car Company RAF
1 Armoured Car Company RAF
1 Armoured Car Company RAF
1 Armoured Car Company RAF